The Men's Super-G competition of the Salt Lake 2002 Olympics was held at Snowbasin on Saturday, February 16. 

The defending world champion was Daron Rahlves of the United States, Austria's Hermann Maier was the defending Olympic and World Cup Super G champion, and teammate Stephan Eberharter led the current season.  Maier was out for the season after a serious motorcycle accident in August.

Ten years after his first Olympic title in 1992, Kjetil André Aamodt of Norway won his second super-G gold, and his second gold of the 2002 Games. Eberharter took the silver, and teammate Andreas Schifferer was the bronze medalist; Rahlves was eighth.

Results
The race was started at 10:00 local time, (UTC−7).

References

External links
Official Olympic Report
Results
FIS results

Super-G